Red Rock is a populated place in Yavapai County, Arizona, United States. In the late 19th century, Red Rock was the principal settlement in the Oak Creek Canyon area. Red Rock is now an upscale suburb of Sedona.

Red Rock Crossing is a scenic former ford across Oak Creek, with photogenic views of Cathedral Rock. The crossing was washed out in a flood in 1978, and there are no current plans to reopen it to automobile traffic. Past proposals to build a bridge at Red Rock Crossing met vociferous opposition.  Most of the crossing is included in the Coconino National Forest's Crescent Moon Ranch recreation area.

Baldwins Crossing is an alternate name for the ford.

Gallery

References

External links
 Crescent Moon Picnic Area at Coconino National Forest
 Red Rock Crossing, information and history, bridge proposal, photo gallery

Unincorporated communities in Yavapai County, Arizona
Unincorporated communities in Arizona
Populated places in Yavapai County, Arizona